Sir William Henry Bragg  (2 July 1862 – 12 March 1942) was an English physicist, chemist, mathematician, and active sportsman who uniquely shared a Nobel Prize with his son Lawrence Bragg – the 1915 Nobel Prize in Physics: "for their services in the analysis of crystal structure by means of X-rays". The mineral Braggite is named after him and his son. He was knighted in 1920.

Biography

Early years
Bragg was born at Westward, near Wigton, Cumberland, England, the son of Robert John Bragg, a merchant marine officer and farmer, and his wife Mary née Wood, a clergyman's daughter. When Bragg was seven years old, his mother died, and he was raised by his uncle, also named William Bragg, at Market Harborough, Leicestershire. He was educated at the Grammar School there, at King William's College on the Isle of Man and, having won an exhibition (scholarship), at Trinity College, Cambridge. He graduated in 1884 as third wrangler, and in 1885 was awarded a first class honours in the mathematical tripos.

University of Adelaide
In 1885, at the age of 23, Bragg was appointed (Sir Thomas) Elder Professor of Mathematics and Experimental Physics in the University of Adelaide, Australia, and started work there early in 1886. Being a skilled mathematician, at that time he had limited knowledge of physics, most of which was in the form of applied mathematics he had learnt at Trinity. Also at that time, there were only about a hundred students doing full courses at Adelaide, of whom less than a handful belonged to the science school, whose deficient teaching facilities Bragg improved by apprenticing himself to a firm of instrument makers. Bragg was an able and popular lecturer; he encouraged the formation of the student union, and the attendance, free of charge, of science teachers at his lectures.

Bragg's interest in physics developed, particularly in the field of electromagnetism.  In 1895, he was visited by Ernest Rutherford, en route from New Zealand to Cambridge; this was the commencement of a lifelong friendship. Bragg had a keen interest in the new discovery of X-rays by Wilhelm Röntgen. On 29 May 1896 at Adelaide, Bragg demonstrated before a meeting of local doctors the application of "X-rays to reveal structures that were otherwise invisible". Samuel Barbour, senior chemist of F. H. Faulding & Co., an Adelaide pharmaceutical manufacturer, supplied the necessary apparatus in the form of a Crookes tube, a glass discharge tube. The tube had been obtained at Leeds, England, where Barbour visited the firm of Reynolds and Branson, a manufacturer of photographic and laboratory equipment. Barbour returned to Adelaide in April 1896. Barbour had conducted his own experiments shortly after return to Australia, but results were limited due to limited battery power. At the University, the tube was attached to an induction coil and a battery borrowed from Sir Charles Todd, Bragg's father-in-law. The induction coil was utilized to produce the electric spark necessary for Bragg and Barbour to "generate short bursts of X-rays". The audience was favorably impressed. Bragg availed himself as a test subject, in the manner of Röntgen and allowed an X-ray photograph to be taken of his hand. The image of the fingers in his hand revealed "an old injury to one of his fingers sustained when using the turnip chopping machine on his father's farm in Cumbria".

As early as 1895, Professor William H. (later Sir William) Bragg was working on wireless telegraphy, though public lectures and demonstrations focussed on his X-ray research which would later lead to his Nobel Prize. In a hurried visit by Rutherford, he was reported as working on a Hertzian oscillator. There were many common practical threads to the two technologies and he was ably assisted in the laboratory by Arthur Lionel Rogers who manufactured much of the equipment. On 21 September 1897 Bragg gave the first recorded public demonstration of the working of wireless telegraphy in Australia during a lecture meeting at the University of Adelaide as part of the Public Teachers' Union conference. Bragg departed Adelaide in December 1897, and spent all of 1898 on a 12-month leave of absence, touring Great Britain and Europe and during this time visited Marconi and inspected his wireless facilities. He returned to Adelaide in early March 1899, and already on 13 May 1899, Bragg and his father-in-law, Sir Charles Todd, were conducting preliminary tests of wireless telegraphy with a transmitter at the Observatory and a receiver on the South Road (about 200 metres). Experiments continued throughout the southern winter of 1899 and the range was progressively extended to Henley Beach. In September the work was extended to two way transmissions with the addition of a second induction coil loaned by Mr. Oddie of Ballarat. It was desired to extend the experiments cross a sea path and Todd was interested in connecting Cape Spencer and Althorpe Island, but local costs were considered prohibitive while the charges for patented equipment from the Marconi Company were exorbitant. At the same time Bragg's interests were leaning towards X-rays and practical work in wireless in South Australia was largely dormant for the next decade.

The turning-point in Bragg's career came in 1904 when he gave the presidential address to section A of the Australasian Association for the Advancement of Science at Dunedin, New Zealand, on "Some Recent Advances in the Theory of the Ionization of Gases". This idea was followed up "in a brilliant series of researches" which, within three years, earned him a fellowship of the Royal Society of London. This paper was also the origin of his first book Studies in Radioactivity (1912). Soon after the delivery of his 1904 address, some radium bromide was made available to Bragg for experimentation. In December 1904 his paper "On the Absorption of α Rays and on the Classification of the α Rays from Radium" appeared in the Philosophical Magazine, and in the same issue a paper "On the Ionization Curves of Radium", written in collaboration with his student Richard Kleeman, also appeared.

At the end of 1908, Bragg returned to England. During his 23 years in Australia "he had seen the number of students at the University of Adelaide almost quadruple, and had a full share in the development of its excellent science school." He had returned to England on the maiden voyage of the SS Waratah, a ship which vanished at sea on its second voyage the next year. He had been alarmed at the ship's tendency to list during his voyage, and had concluded that the ship's metacentre was just below her centre of gravity. In 1911, he testified his belief that the Waratah was unstable at the Inquiry into the ship's disappearance.

University of Leeds

Bragg occupied the Cavendish chair of physics at the University of Leeds from 1909 until 1915. He continued his work on X-rays with much success. He invented the X-ray spectrometer and with his son, Lawrence Bragg, then a research student at Cambridge, founded the new science of X-ray crystallography, the analysis of crystal structure using X-ray diffraction.

World War I

Both of his sons were called into the army after war broke out in 1914 . The following year he was appointed Quain Professor of physics at University College London. He had to wait for almost a year to contribute to the war effort: finally, in July 1915, he was appointed to the Board of Invention and Research set up by the Admiralty. In September, his younger son Robert died of wounds at Gallipoli. In November, he shared the Nobel Prize in Physics with elder son William Lawrence. The Navy was struggling to prevent sinkings by unseen, submerged U boats. The scientists recommended that the best tactic was to listen for the submarines. The Navy had a hydrophone research establishment at Aberdour Scotland, staffed with navy men. In November 1915, two young physicists were added to its staff. Bowing to outside pressure for using science, in July 1916, the Admiralty appointed Bragg as scientific director at Aberdour, assisted by three additional young physicists. They developed an improved directional hydrophone, which finally convinced the Admiralty of their usefulness. Late in 1916, Bragg with his small group moved to Harwich, where the staff was enlarged and they had access to a submarine for tests. In France, where scientists had been mobilized since the beginning of the war, the physicist Paul Langevin made a major stride with echolocation, generating intense sound pulses with quartz sheets oscillated at high frequency, which were then used as microphones to listen for echoes. Quartz was usable when vacuum tubes became available at the end of 1917 to amplify the faint signals. The British made sonar practicable by using mosaics of small quartz bits rather than slices from a large crystal. In January 1918, Bragg moved into the Admiralty as head of scientific research in the anti-submarine division. By war's end British vessels were being equipped with sonar manned by trained listeners.

Inspired by William Lawrence's methods for locating enemy guns by the sound of their firing, the output from six microphones miles apart along the coast were recorded on moving photographic film. Sound ranging is much more accurate in the sea than in the turbulent atmosphere. They were able to localize the sites of distant explosions, which were used to obtain the precise positions of British warships and of minefields.

University College London
After the war Bragg returned to University College London, where he continued to work on crystal analysis.

Royal Institution
From 1923, he was Fullerian Professor of Chemistry at the Royal Institution and director of the Davy Faraday Research Laboratory. This institution was practically rebuilt in 1929–30 and, under Bragg's directorship many valuable papers were issued from the laboratory. In 1919, 1923, 1925 and 1931 he was invited to deliver the Royal Institution Christmas Lecture on The World of Sound; Concerning the Nature of Things, Old Trades and New Knowledge and The Universe of Life respectively.

The Royal Society and the coming war
Bragg was elected president of the Royal Society in 1935. The physiologist A. V. Hill was biological secretary and soon A. C. G. Egerton became physical secretary. During World War I all three had stood by for frustrating months before their skills were employed for the war effort. Now the cause of science was strengthened by the report of a high-level Army committee on lessons learned in the last war; their first recommendation was to "keep abreast of modern scientific developments". Anticipating another war, the Ministry of Labour was persuaded to accept Hill as a consultant on scientific manpower. The Royal Society compiled a register of qualified men. They proposed a small committee on science to advise the Committee on Imperial Defence, but this was rejected. Finally in 1940, as Bragg's term ended, a scientific advisory committee to the War Cabinet was appointed. Bragg died in 1942.

Honours and awards
Bragg was joint winner with his son, Lawrence Bragg, of the Nobel Prize in Physics in 1915: "For their services in the analysis of crystal structure by means of X-ray".

Bragg was elected Fellow of the Royal Society in 1907, vice-president in 1920, and served as President of the Royal Society from 1935 to 1940. He was elected as a member of the Royal Academy of Science, Letters and Fine Arts of Belgium on 1 June 1946.

He was appointed Commander of the Order of the British Empire (CBE) in 1917 and Knight Commander (KBE) in the 1920 civilian war honours. He was admitted to the Order of Merit in 1931.

 Matteucci Medal (1915)
 Rumford Medal (1916)
 Copley Medal (1930)
 Franklin Medal (1930)
 John J. Carty Award of the National Academy of Sciences (1939)

Private life
In 1889, in Adelaide, Bragg married Gwendoline Todd, a skilled water-colour painter, and daughter of astronomer, meteorologist and electrical engineer Sir Charles Todd. They had three children, a daughter, Gwendolen and two sons, William Lawrence, born in 1890 in North Adelaide, and Robert. Gwendolen married the English architect Alban Caroe, Bragg taught William at the University of Adelaide, and Robert was killed in the Battle of Gallipoli. Bragg's wife, Gwendoline, died in 1929.

Bragg played tennis and golf, and as a founding member of the North Adelaide and Adelaide University Lacrosse Clubs, contributed to the introduction of lacrosse to South Australia and was also the secretary of the Adelaide University Chess Association.

Bragg died in 1942 in England and was survived by his daughter Gwendolen and his son, Lawrence.

Legacy
The lecture theatre of King William's College (KWC) is named in memory of Bragg; the Sixth-Form invitational literary debating society at KWC, the Bragg Society, is also named in his memory. One of the school "Houses" at Robert Smyth School, Market Harborough, Leicester, is named "Bragg" in memory of him being a student there. Since 1992, the Australian Institute of Physics has awarded The Bragg Gold Medal for Excellence in Physics for the best PhD thesis by a student at an Australian university. The two sides of the medal contain the images of Sir William Henry and his son Sir Lawrence Bragg.

The Experimental Technique Centre at Brunel University is named the Bragg Building. The Sir William Henry Bragg Building at the University of Leeds opened in 2021.

In 1962, the Bragg Laboratories were constructed at the University of Adelaide to commemorate 100 years since the birth of Sir William H. Bragg.

The Australian Bragg Centre for Proton Therapy also in Adelaide, Australia was completed in late 2013. It is named for both father and son and offers radiation therapy for cancer patients.

In August 2013, Bragg's relative, the broadcaster Melvyn Bragg, presented a BBC Radio 4 programme "Bragg on the Braggs" on the 1915 Nobel Prize in Physics winners.

Publications
 William Henry Bragg, William Lawrence Bragg, "X Rays and Crystal Structure", G. Bell & Son, London, 1915. 
 William Henry Bragg, The World of Sound (1920)
 William Henry Bragg, The Crystalline State – The Romanes Lecture for 1925. Oxford, 1925.
 William Henry Bragg, Concerning the Nature of Things (1925)
 William Henry Bragg, Old Trades and New Knowledge (1926)
 William Henry Bragg, An Introduction to Crystal Analysis (1928)
 William Henry Bragg, The Universe of Light (1933)

See also
 George Gamow – has 1931 photograph with Bragg, location unspecified.
 List of Nobel laureates in Physics
 List of presidents of the Royal Society

References

Further reading
"[a] most valuable record of his work and picture of his personality is the excellent obituary written by Professor Andrade of London University for the Royal Society of London." Statement made by Sir Kerr Grant, in:
"The Life and work of Sir William Bragg", the John Murtagh Macrossan Memorial Lecture for 1950, University of Queensland. Written and presented by Sir Kerr Grant, Emeritus Professor of Physics, University of Adelaide. Reproduced as pages 5–37 of Bragg Centenary, 1886–1986, University of Adelaide.
"William and Lawrence Bragg, Father and Son: The Most Extraordinary Collaboration in Science", John Jenkin, Oxford University Press 2008.
 Ross, John F. A History of Radio in South Australia 1897–1977 (J. F. Ross, 1978)

External links

 Annotated Bibliography for William Henry Bragg from the Alsos Digital Library for Nuclear Issues 
 Data from the University of Leeds 
 Fullerian Professorships
 Nobelprize.org – The Nobel Prize for Physics in 1915
 
 

1862 births
1942 deaths
20th-century British physicists
Academics of University College London
Alumni of Trinity College, Cambridge
Australian people of English descent
Australian lacrosse players
British lacrosse players
Experimental physicists
Optical physicists
Fellows of the Royal Society
Foreign associates of the National Academy of Sciences
Members of the Royal Academy of Belgium
Academics of the University of Leeds
Knights Commander of the Order of the British Empire
Members of the Order of Merit
Nobel laureates in Physics
People from Wigton
Presidents of the Royal Society
Recipients of the Copley Medal
Academic staff of the University of Adelaide
People educated at King William's College
Presidents of the Institute of Physics
Presidents of the Physical Society
X-ray crystallography
British crystallographers
English Nobel laureates
X-ray pioneers
Leeds Blue Plaques
Recipients of the Matteucci Medal
Presidents of the International Union of Pure and Applied Physics
[Category:Cavendish Professors of Physics]]